Leaving Las Vegas is a semi-autobiographical 1990 novel by John O'Brien. The novel was adapted into a 1995 film of the same name, starring Nicolas Cage and Elisabeth Shue. The film was nominated for four Academy Awards, winning one.

O'Brien died of a self-inflicted gunshot wound within weeks of signing away the film rights to the novel.

References

1990 American novels
American novels adapted into films
Novels about alcoholism
Novels about American prostitution